The Master Plan is a 1954 British film noir drama film directed by Cy Endfield and starring Norman Wooland, Tilda Thamar and Wayne Morris.  It is set at the headquarters of NATO. Based on a teleplay Operation North Star by Harald Bratt, it was produced as a second feature. It was made at Southall Studios with sets designed by the art director Scott MacGregor.

Plot
Following the Second World War, an American army officer stationed in West Germany is assigned with keeping classified information away from the Communists. Unfortunately, enemy agents know that he suffers from sudden black-outs and use this to hypnotise him, and make it appear that he is a traitor.

Cast
 Norman Wooland as Colonel Mark Cleaver
 Tilda Thamar as Helen Quaid
 Wayne Morris as Major Thomas Brent
 Mary Mackenzie as Miss Gray
 Arnold Bell as General Harry Goulding
 Marjorie Stewart as Yvonne Goulding
 Laurie Main as Johnny Orwell
 Frederick Schrecker as Doctor Morganstern
 Richard Marner as Man 
 Alan Tilvern as Otto Szimek 
 Lucienne Hill as 	Kathleen Steffanson 
 John Gabriel as 	Dr. Horn

Critical reception
TV Guide wrote, "the intriguing story suffers from inefficient production techniques."

References

Bibliography
 Chibnall, Steve & McFarlane, Brian. The British 'B' Film. Palgrave MacMillan, 2009.

External links

1954 films
1954 drama films
Films directed by Cy Endfield
British drama films
Films shot at Southall Studios
1950s English-language films
British black-and-white films
1950s British films